Wu Hsin-tai (born 1 July 1987) is a Taiwanese politician. She is a member of the Taiwan Statebuilding Party.

Political career
In November 2019, Wu accepted a nomination from the Taiwan Statebuilding Party to contest the 2020 election as an at-large legislative candidate. She was ranked third on the TSP party list. The Taiwan Statebuilding Party won over three percent of the party list vote, allowing zero at-large legislative candidates to take office.

References

External links
 

1987 births
Living people
Taiwan Statebuilding Party politicians
People from Taoyuan City